Serneke Group AB, commonly known as Serneke, is a construction and development company based in Gothenburg, Sweden. Serneke was founded in 2002 as Serneke och Fagerberg bygg och konsult AB, later shortened to SEFA. The company was renamed Serneke in 2014. The company has grown rapidly, and was listed on Nasdaq Stockholm in 2016, having had a revenue of SEK 3.1 billion in 2015. By 2019, Serneke was the seventh largest construction company in Sweden.

Notable Serneke projects include Prioritet Serneke Arena, a multi-sport complex inaugurated in 2015, and Karlatornet, a skyscraper currently under construction in Gothenburg that will be the tallest building in the Nordic countries when completed.

References

External links

Construction and civil engineering companies of Sweden
Construction and civil engineering companies established in 2002
Companies based in Gothenburg
Companies listed on Nasdaq Stockholm
Swedish companies established in 2002